The  is a hotel and convention complex in Shinjuku, Tokyo, Japan. The main hall can accommodate 1,360 guests.

Performances
Musical artists who have performed at the Nippon Seinenkan include Shiritsu Ebisu Chugaku, on July 1, 2012. Others include Frank Zappa, Thin Lizzy, Dire Straits, Black Sabbath and AC/DC.

References

External links
 

Music venues in Tokyo
Buildings and structures in Shinjuku
Hotels in Tokyo